I Am Kloot Play Moolah Rouge is the fourth studio album by English rock band I Am Kloot. A limited edition version of 2000 copies was on sale to the public attending their show at Manchester Academy 3 on 24 November 2007, and the following dates on their mini-tour of England and Europe. The album was commercially released on 14 April 2008.

Track listing

CD 

All songs written by John Bramwell.

DVD 
Includes an interview with John Bramwell (the conversation is illustrated with fragments of I Am Kloot concerts) and fragments of a special live performance, recorded in Moolah Rouge Studios:

Personnel

Instruments 
I Am Kloot:
 John Bramwell
 Andy Hargreaves
 Peter Jobson
featuring:
 Norman McLeod – guitar, pedal steel guitar, lap steel guitar
 Colin McLeod – piano, Hammond organ, Rhodes

Production and mixing 
CD:
 The McLeod Brothers (Colin & Norman McLeod) & I Am Kloot – production
 Seadna McPhail – engineering (all tracks except "Only Role in Town")
 Dan Broad – engineering ("Only Role in Town")
 Richard Knowles – live engineering
 Danny McTauge – assistant
 Colin McLeod & I Am Kloot – mixing
 Keir Stewart – mastering (at Inch Studios)

DVD:
 John Robb – interview
 Mike Buttery, Ben Gordon, Nick Gillespie – camera
 Richard Goodaire – lighting/camera
 Alex Meadows – additional photography and stills
 Seadna McPhail – sound recording
 Danny McTague – recording assistant
 Phil Bulleyment – sound mixing
 Rachael Kichenside – production assistant
 Leif Johnson – editor
 Mike Buttery – assistant producer
 Daniel Parrott – producer/director
 Channel M Television – production

Artwork 
 Alex Meadows – photography

Singles

References

External links 
 Moolah Rouge Studios official web site
 Alex Meadows photography
 I Am Kloot feature shoot @ Moolah Rouge Studios for Sandman magazine (18 Jan 2007, author: David Logan)

2007 albums
2008 albums
I Am Kloot albums